"Little Liar" is a song written by P.F. Sloan and Steve Barri and performed by Terry Black.  It reached #10 in Canada in 1965.  The song was featured on his 1965 album, Only 16.

The song was produced by Lou Adler.

References

1965 songs
1965 singles
Songs written by P. F. Sloan
Songs written by Steve Barri
Terry Black songs
Song recordings produced by Lou Adler